Rats in the Ranks is an Australian documentary film released in 1996.

The film detailed the last weeks of the 1994 Leichhardt Council mayoral elections.

The filmmakers, Bob Connolly and Robin Anderson (later known for Facing the Music and other projects, but already well known) were allowed access to the innermost meetings of participants including the serving mayor Larry Hand and his Labor Party opponents. Hand's exposure to a wider audience spawned the character Col Dunkley in the successful Australian TV series Grass Roots, and Rats in the Ranks is regarded as a classic in its portrayal of local politics in Australia.

Awards
Rats in the Ranks has been screened at more than forty film festivals and has won multiple awards, including the Silver Plaque for Social/Political Documentary at the Chicago International Film Festival in 1996, the 1996 Critics Choice Award for Documentary at the Sydney Film Festival, and the Logie Award for most outstanding documentary series/program in 1998.

Box office
Rats in the Ranks grossed $200,000 at the box office in Australia.

See also
Cinema of Australia
Australian films of 1996
Logie Awards of 1998

References

External links
Rats in the Ranks (1996)

Rats in the Ranks at Oz Movies

1996 films
Australian documentary films
Documentary films about politics
Films shot in Australia
Films by Bob Connolly
Documentary films about Australia
1996 documentary films
1990s political films
Australian political films
1990s English-language films
Documentary films about elections